Montedinove is a comune (municipality) in the Province of Ascoli Piceno in the Italian region Marche, located about  south of Ancona and about  north of Ascoli Piceno.

The municipality of Montedinove contains the frazioni (subdivisions, mainly villages and hamlets) Croce Rossa, Contrada lago, San Tommaso, and Trippanera.

Montedinove borders the following municipalities: Castignano, Montalto delle Marche, Montelparo, Rotella.

Demographic evolution

References

External links

 www.comune.montedinove.ap.it/
 www.montedinove.org

Cities and towns in the Marche